Wirt may refer to:

People

Wirt as surname
 Elizabeth Washington Gamble Wirt (1784-1857), American author
 John S. Wirt (1851–1904), American politician and lawyer
 Václav Wirt (1893-1962), Czech gymnast
 Wigand Wirt (1460-1519), German theologian
 William Wirt (Attorney General) (1772-1834), American author and statesman
 William Wirt (educator) (1874-1938), American educator

Wirt as given name
 Wirt Sikes (1836-1883), American journalist and writer
 Wirt Williams (1921-1986), American journalist, writer, and educator
 Wirt Yerger (b. 1930), American businessman and politician 
 Wirt, a character from the Diablo video game
 Wirt, the main character from Over the Garden Wall

Places 
 Wirt, Indiana
 Wirt, New York
 Wirt, Minnesota
 Wirt Township, Itasca County, Minnesota
 Wirt County, West Virginia

Other 
 2044 Wirt, an asteroid
 WIRT-DT, a U.S. television station

See also 
 Wirth